Ester Rachel Kamińska; née Ester-Rokhl Halpern (Porozów, 10 March 1870 – Warsaw, 25 December 1925) was a Polish Jewish actress, known as the mother of Yiddish theatre. She won fame as the star of a series of Yiddish theater companies managed by her husband, Avrom Yitshok Kamiński (Abraham Isaac Kamiński), touring in the cities and small towns of the Russian Empire from approximately 1893 to 1905. In Warsaw, in 1907 they together founded the Literary Troupe (Literarishe trupe), the first Yiddish theater company to dedicate itself to a 'literary' or 'artistic' repertoire.

She was the mother of Ida Kamińska (1899–1980), the well known stage and film actress, who cofounded the Warsaw Yiddish Art Theater in the 1920s, and, in 1946, following the Second World War, played in reestablished Yiddish theaters in Poland. Today, the Jewish Theatre, Warsaw is named after the two actresses.

References

External links
Ester Rachel Kamińska on IMDb

1870 births
1925 deaths
People from Svislach District
People from Volkovyssky Uyezd
Belarusian Jews
Yiddish theatre performers
Polish stage actresses
Jewish Polish actresses